New Sweden is an unincorporated community in New Sweden Township, Nicollet County, Minnesota, United States.  The community is located near the junction of State Highways 22 (MN 22) and 111 (MN 111).

A post office called New Sweden was established in 1884, and remained in operation until 1905. A large share of the early settlers being natives of Sweden caused the name to be selected.

References

Unincorporated communities in Nicollet County, Minnesota
Unincorporated communities in Minnesota